SS9 may refer to:
 SS-9 Scarp, a Soviet intercontinental ballistic missile
 China Railways SS9, an electric locomotive
 , a submarine of the United States Navy
 Energica Eva EsseEsse9, an electric motorcycle